Brazelton is a surname. Notable people with the surname include:

Conni Marie Brazelton (born 1955), American film and television actress appearing on ER (TV series)
Dewon Brazelton (born 1980), major league pitcher currently a free agent
Kitty Brazelton (born 1951), American vocalist, composer, flutist, and lead singer of the band Dadadah
Ralph Brazelton Peck (1912–2008), civil engineer specializing in soil mechanics
T. Berry Brazelton (1918–2018), pediatrician and author in the United States
Tyrone Brazelton (born 1986), American professional basketball player
William Brazelton, outlaw and stage robber of the Wild West

See also
11369 Brazelton (1998 QE33), a Main-belt Asteroid discovered in 1998